The 2019 FC Astana season was the eleventh successive season that Astana played in the Kazakhstan Premier League, the highest tier of association football in Kazakhstan. Astana defended their Kazakhstan Premier League title, having won their fifth title the previous season. Domestically, Astana defeated FC Kairat in the season-opening Super Cup and reached the Last 16 of the Kazakhstan Cup. In Europe, Astana entered the Champions League at the First qualifying round and were defeated by CFR Cluj, dropping into the Europa League where they reached the Group Stage.

Season events
When announcing their pre-season training camp dates, Astana also announced that Roman Hryhorchuk would return to lead the team after missing the second half of the 2018 season due to family reasons. On 28 January, Pedro Henrique's loan ended early and he returned to PAOK.

On 22 February, Astana announced the signing of Luka Šimunović on a three-year contract from Shakhtyor Soligorsk.

On 26 February, Astana announced the signing of Dorin Rotariu on a four-year contract from Club Brugge.

On 17 June, Astana announced the signing of Rúnar Már Sigurjónsson on a free transfer after his contract with Grasshoppers had expired.

On 2 July, Astana announced the signing of Ndombe Mubele on a one-year loan deal from Toulouse.

On 1 August, after their 4-1 victory over Santa Coloma in the UEFA Europa League Second Round Qualifier, Astana announced that Marin Aničić had moved to Konyaspor for an undisclosed fee.

On 3 August, Astana announced the signing of Žarko Tomašević on a free transfer.

On 26 August, Astana announced that Antonio Rukavina had extended his contract with the club until 2021, and that Marin Tomasov had extended his contract until 2022.

On 20 December, Ivan Mayewski signed a new 1+1-year contract with Astana, whilst the club confirmed that Yevgeny Postnikov had also extended his contract.

Squad

On loan

Transfers

In

Out

Loans in

Loans out

Released

Friendlies

Competitions

Super Cup

Premier League

Results summary

Results by round

Results

League table

Kazakhstan Cup

UEFA Champions League

Qualifying rounds

UEFA Europa League

Qualifying rounds

Group stage

Squad statistics

Appearances and goals

|-
|colspan="14"|Players away from Astana on loan:

|-
|colspan="14"|Players who left Astana during the season:

|}

Goal scorers

Clean sheet

Disciplinary record

References

External links
Official Website 
Official VK

FC Astana seasons
Astana
Astana
Astana